The United States Army Regimental System (USARS) is an organizational and classification system used by the United States Army. It was established in 1981 to replace the Combat Arms Regimental System (CARS) to provide each soldier with continuous identification with a single regiment, and to increase a soldier's probability of serving recurring assignments with his or her regiment. The USARS was intended to enhance combat effectiveness by providing the opportunity for a regimental affiliation, thus obtaining some of the benefits of the traditional regimental system.

Overview

USARS was developed to include the active Army (all combat, combat support (CS), combat service support (CSS), and special branches as well as appropriate training battalions) and the reserve components (the Army National Guard and the Army Reserve).

It was developed to offer the opportunity for long-term identification with a regiment or corps, provide the potential for recurring assignments within a regiment or corps, provide the opportunity to further emphasize the history, customs, and traditions of the regiment or corps, and provide regiments that are structured as one or more continental United States (CONUS) units of like type linked with one or more units of like type outside the continental United States (OCONUS), or one or more units of like type located exclusively in either CONUS or OCONUS, including one or more training battalions or tactical armored cavalry or ranger regiments.

USARS is also designed to provide for CS, CSS, and special branches to operate on a “whole branch” concept as a corps or special branch, carrying on the activities and traditions of a regiment, offer regimental affiliation to allow soldiers the opportunity for continuous identification with a combat arms regiment, a corps, or special branch throughout their careers. USARS provides (through regimental affiliation) different opportunities for soldiers, depending upon which combat arms regiment they choose to be affiliated with or whether they affiliate with a CS or CSS corps or special branch. In addition, the regimental affiliation process allows combat arms soldiers to select the regiment of choice (soldiers can change their affiliation at any time); provides that CS, CSS, and special branch soldiers will automatically be affiliated with their corps or special branch; specifies that all soldiers will belong to a regiment or corps; permits no limit to the number of soldiers who can be affiliated with a regiment or corps; and provides that DA civilians can automatically be affiliated with a regiment or corps by direction of the regiment or corps commander.

Combat arms

Concept
Combat arms is a rescinded doctrinal term, though colloquially it includes air defense artillery, armor, aviation, field artillery, infantry, and special forces regiments. Combat arms soldiers may affiliate with any of the combat arms regiments consistent with their primary military occupational specialty (PMOS), specialty code, special qualification identifiers (SQI), or additional skill identifiers (ASI). Soldiers will have greater opportunities to serve recurring assignments in their regiments if regiments are chosen that have battalions in both CONUS and OCONUS locations. Since there is no ceiling on the number of soldiers who can affiliate with a particular regiment, the potential for recurring assignments to regiments is diminished where the number of affiliated soldiers exceeds the requirements.

Affiliation policy
Quoting from Chapter 3–2, page 7 of Army Regulation 600-82, U.S. Army Regimental System
(note: Currently the regulation for The U.S. Army Regimental System is Army Regulation 870-21):

a. USARS regiments offered to active Army and USAR soldiers for affiliation are listed [below].

 (1) All active Army soldiers are required to affiliate with a regiment. Although affiliation is mandatory, the choice of regiment is left up to the individual. Officers who are single-tracked in a Functional Area will affiliate with a regiment associated with their basic combat arms branch. Functional Area officers who have no basic branch will submit request for regimental affiliation using procedures outlined below. Regimental affiliation is based on the Army branch associated with a soldier’s PMOS or specialty. AR 670–1 contains a listing of all PMOS and corresponding branches for each. Army recruiters who have been assigned the SQI“4” will affiliate with a regiment associated with their PMOS. Recruiters or retention noncommissioned officers (NCOs) will be affiliated with The Adjutant General Corps. Regimental affiliation may be changed at any time; however, the regimental selection must be associated with the soldier’s PMOS or specialty.

 (2) All combat arms officers and soldiers will affiliate with a regiment upon arrival at their first unit of assignment. These Soldiers will be affiliated with their regiment of assignment unless they voluntarily select another. Combat arms officers and soldiers whose initial Army assignment is not to a regimental unit may defer selection until they are so assigned.

 (3) Enlisted soldiers may elect the Regiment of Choice Reenlistment Option under AR 601–280.

 (4) Soldiers who deliberately terminate airborne status after affiliating with an airborne regiment will change their affiliation to a non-airborne regiment at the time of their termination. Those who are terminated for medical reasons may retain their regimental affiliation with an airborne regiment if they desire; however, such affiliation will be ceremonial and will not affect subsequent assignments.

 (5) Regimental affiliation will be a primary assignment consideration for officers and enlisted soldiers. To the maximum extent possible, soldiers who are regimentally affiliated will be assigned to their regimental units. No assignment guarantees will be made, as Army requirements and soldier professional development needs must be met; however, it is incumbent upon commanders and the personnel community to make every effort to ensure that requisitions are submitted for and filled with affiliated regimental Soldiers and that soldiers are subsequently assigned within their regiments. (See AR 614–100, and AR 614–185 for officers, and AR 614–200 for enlisted soldiers).

b. Specific procedures for affiliation are below. These procedures permit affiliation and change of affiliation to be administered at the local Personnel Service Center (PSC) level.

c. Active Army soldiers who are accessioned into the USAR will retain their regimental affiliation unless they elect to change their affiliation, which may be done at any time.

Combat arms regiments
Note: There are currently 177 USARS regiments, with only 47 consisting of units at multiple locations. Some of the regimental battalions are assigned to brigade combat teams in multiple divisions.  Only 27 of these regiments meet the USARS "Conus/Oconus goal."
Additionally, the term "Regiment" was not officially appended to a USARS regiment's official name/designation (and was not used under CARS) until 2005.

Artillery regiments

Air defense artillery regiments 
1st Air Defense Artillery Regiment
 1st Battalion, 94th Army Air and Missile Defense Command,  Kadena Air Base Japan
 2nd Battalion, 35th Air Defense Artillery Brigade, Osan Air Base, Korea
2nd Air Defense Artillery Regiment
 Battery A, 11th Air Defense Artillery Brigade, Fort Bliss, Texas
 Battery B, 11th Air Defense Artillery Brigade, Fort Bliss, Texas
 3rd Battalion, 31st Air Defense Artillery Brigade, Fort Sill, Oklahoma
3rd Air Defense Artillery Regiment
 4th Battalion, 31st Air Defense Artillery Brigade, Fort Sill, Oklahoma
4th Air Defense Artillery Regiment
 Battery A, 11th Air Defense Artillery Brigade, Fort Bliss, Texas
 3rd Battalion, 108th Air Defense Artillery Brigade, Fort Bragg, North Carolina
5th Air Defense Artillery Regiment
 4th Battalion, 69th Air Defense Artillery Brigade, Fort Hood, Texas
 5th Battalion, 31st Air Defense Artillery Brigade, Fort Sill, Oklahoma
6th Air Defense Artillery Regiment (Training Regiment)
 2nd Battalion, 30th Air Defense Artillery Brigade, Fort Sill, Oklahoma
 3rd Battalion, 30th Air Defense Artillery Brigade, Fort Sill, Oklahoma
7th Air Defense Artillery Regiment
 1st Battalion, 108th Air Defense Artillery Brigade, Fort Bragg, North Carolina
 5th Battalion, 10th Army Air & Missile Defense Command, Germany
43rd Air Defense Artillery Regiment
 1st Battalion, 11th Air Defense Artillery Brigade, Fort Bliss, Texas
 2nd Battalion, 11th Air Defense Artillery Brigade, Fort Bliss, Texas
 3rd Battalion, 11th Air Defense Artillery Brigade, Fort Bliss, Texas
44th Air Defense Artillery Regiment
 1st Battalion, 69th Air Defense Artillery Brigade, Fort Hood, Texas
 2nd Battalion, 108th Air Defense Artillery Brigade, Fort Campbell, Kentucky
52nd Air Defense Artillery Regiment
 5th Battalion, 11th Air Defense Artillery Brigade, Fort Bliss, Texas
 6th Battalion, 35th Air Defense Artillery Brigade, Osan Air Base, Korea
56th Air Defense Artillery Regiment
 1st Battalion (ADA Officer Training), 30th Air Defense Artillery Brigade, Fort Sill, Oklahoma
62nd Air Defense Artillery Regiment
 1st Battalion, 69th Air Defense Artillery Brigade, Fort Hood, Texas

Field artillery regiments
1st Field Artillery Regiment
 4th Battalion, 3rd BCT, 1st Armored Division, Fort Bliss, Texas
2nd Field Artillery Regiment
 2nd Battalion, 428th Field Artillery Brigade, Fort Sill, Oklahoma
3rd Field Artillery Regiment
 2nd Battalion, 1st ABCT, 1st Armored Division, Fort Bliss, Texas
 5th Battalion, 17th Field Artillery Brigade, I Corps, Joint Base Lewis-McChord, Washington
4th Field Artillery Regiment
 
 5th Field Artillery Regiment
 1st Battalion, 1st BCT, 1st Infantry Division, Fort Riley, Kansas
 
6th Field Artillery Regiment
 3rd Battalion, 1st BCT, 10th Mountain Division (Light Infantry), Fort Drum, New York
7th Field Artillery Regiment
 1st Battalion, 2nd BCT, 1st Infantry Division, Fort Riley, Kansas
 3rd Battalion, 3rd BCT, 25th Infantry Division, Schofield Barracks, Hawaii
8th Field Artillery Regiment
 2nd Battalion, 1st BCT, 25th Infantry Division, Fort Wainwright, Alaska
9th Field Artillery Regiment
 1st Battalion, 2nd BCT, 3rd Infantry Division, Fort Stewart, Georgia
10th Field Artillery Regiment

11th Field Artillery Regiment
 2nd Battalion, 2nd BCT, 25th Infantry Division, Schofield Barracks, Hawaii
12th Field Artillery Regiment
 2nd Battalion, 1st BCT, 4th Infantry Division, Fort Carson, Colorado
13th Field Artillery Regiment
 3rd Battalion, 75th Field Artillery Brigade, Fort Sill, Oklahoma
14th Field Artillery Regiment
 
15th Field Artillery Regiment
 1st Battalion, 1st BCT, 2nd Infantry Division, South Korea
 2nd Battalion, 2nd BCT, 10th Mountain Division (Light Infantry), Fort Drum, New York
16th Field Artillery Regiment
 3rd Battalion, 2nd BCT, 4th Infantry Division, Fort Carson, Colorado
17th Field Artillery Regiment
 1st Battalion, 75th Field Artillery Brigade, Fort Sill, Oklahoma
 3rd Battalion, 2nd BCT, 2nd Infantry Division, Joint Base Lewis-McChord, Washington
18th Field Artillery Regiment
 2nd Battalion, 75th Field Artillery Brigade, Fort Sill, Oklahoma
19th Field Artillery Regiment
 1st Battalion, 434th Field Artillery Brigade, Fort Sill, Oklahoma
 20th Field Artillery Regiment
 2nd Battalion, 41st Field Artillery Brigade, Fort Hood, Texas
21st Field Artillery Regiment
 1st Battalion, 41st Field Artillery Brigade, Fort Hood, Texas
22nd Field Artillery Regiment
 1st Battalion, 434th Field Artillery Brigade, Fort Sill, Oklahoma
25th Field Artillery Regiment
 5th Battalion, 3rd BCT, 10th Mountain Division (Light Infantry), Fort Polk, Louisiana
26th Field Artillery Regiment
 Battery A (Target Acquisition), 41st Field Artillery Brigade, III Corps, Fort Hood, Texas
 Battery B (Target Acquisition), 212th Field Artillery Brigade, III Corps, Fort Bliss, Texas
 Battery C (Target Acquisition), 75th Field Artillery Brigade, III Corps, Fort Sill, Oklahoma
 Battery D (Target Acquisition), 18th Field Artillery Brigade, XVIII Airborne Corps, Fort Bragg, North Carolina
 Battery F (Target Acquisition), 17th Field Artillery Brigade, I Corps, Fort Lewis, Washington
 
27th Field Artillery Regiment
 3rd Battalion, 18th Field Artillery Brigade, XVIII Airborne Corps, Fort Bragg, North Carolina
 4th Battalion, 2nd BCT, 1st Armored Division, Fort Bliss, Texas
29th Field Artillery Regiment
 2nd Battalion, 4th BCT, 1st Armored Division, Fort Bliss, Texas
 3rd Battalion, 3rd BCT, 4th Infantry Division, Fort Carson, Colorado
30th Field Artillery Regiment
 1st Battalion, 428th Field Artillery Brigade, Fort Sill, Oklahoma
32nd Field Artillery Regiment
 2nd Battalion, 4th BCT, 1st Infantry Division, Fort Riley, Kansas
37th Field Artillery Regiment
 1st Battalion, 3rd BCT (Styker), 2nd Infantry Division, Fort Lewis, Washington
 6th Battalion, 210th Field Artillery Brigade, 2nd Infantry Division, South Korea
38th Field Artillery Regiment
 1st Battalion, 210th Field Artillery Brigade, 2nd Infantry Division, South Korea
40th Field Artillery Regiment
 1st Battalion, 434th Field Artillery Brigade, Fort Sill, Oklahoma
41st Field Artillery Regiment
 1st Battalion, 1st BCT, 3rd Infantry Division, Fort Stewart, Georgia
 42nd Field Artillery Regiment
 4th Battalion, 1st BCT, 4th Infantry Division, Carson, Colorado
76th Field Artillery Regiment

77th Field Artillery Regiment
 2nd Battalion, 4th BCT, 4th Infantry Division, Fort Carson, Colorado
78th Field Artillery Regiment
 1st Battalion, 428th Field Artillery Brigade, Fort Sill, Oklahoma
79th Field Artillery Regiment
 1st Battalion, 434th Field Artillery Brigade, Fort Sill, Oklahoma
82nd Field Artillery Regiment
 1st Battalion, 1st BCT, 1st Cavalry Division, Fort Hood, Texas
 2nd Battalion, 3rd BCT, 1st Cavalry Division, Fort Hood, Texas
 3rd Battalion, 2nd BCT, 1st Cavalry Division, Fort Hood, Texas
84th Field Artillery Regiment
94th Field Artillery Regiment
 1st Battalion, 17th Field Artillery Brigade, I Corps, Joint Base Lewis-Mcchord, Washington
194th Field Artillery Regiment
 1st Battalion, 2nd BCT, 34th Infantry Division, Fort Dodge, Iowa
319th Field Artillery Regiment (Airborne)
 1st Battalion, 3rd BCT, 82nd Airborne Division, Fort Bragg, North Carolina
 2nd Battalion, 2nd BCT, 82nd Airborne Division, Fort Bragg, North Carolina
 3rd Battalion, 1st BCT, 82nd Airborne Division, Fort Bragg, North Carolina
 4th Battalion, 173rd ABCT, Grafenwoehr, Germany
320th Field Artillery Regiment (Air Assault)
 1st Battalion, 2nd BCT, 101st Airborne Division (Air Assault), Fort Campbell, Kentucky
 2nd Battalion, 1st BCT, 101st Airborne Division (Air Assault), Fort Campbell, Kentucky
 3rd Battalion, 3rd BCT, 101st Airborne Division (Air Assault), Fort Campbell, Kentucky
321st Field Artillery Regiment
 1st Battalion (Airborne), 18th Field Artillery Brigade, XVIII Airborne Corps, Fort Bragg, North Carolina
 3rd Battalion, 18th Field Artillery Brigade, XVIII Airborne Corps, Fort Bragg, North Carolina
333rd Field Artillery Regiment
 Battery F (Target Acquisition), 210th Field Artillery Brigade, 2nd Infantry Division, South Korea
377th Field Artillery Regiment
 1st Battalion, 17th Field Artillery Brigade, I Corps, Joint Base Lewis-McChord, Washington
 2nd Battalion (Airborne), 4th BCT, 25th Infantry Division, Fort Richardson, Alaska

Armored and cavalry regiments

Armored regiments 
34th Armored Regiment
 2nd Battalion, 1st BCT, 1st Infantry Division, Fort Riley, Kansas
35th Armored Regiment
 1st Battalion, 2nd BCT, 1st Armored Division, Fort Bliss, Texas
37th Armored Regiment
 1st Battalion, 2nd BCT, 1st Armored Division, Fort Bliss, Texas
 2nd Battalion, 1st BCT, 1st Armored Division, Fort Bliss, Texas
63rd Armored Regiment
 1st Battalion, 2nd BCT, 1st Infantry Division, Fort Riley, Kansas
64th Armored Regiment
 1st Battalion, 1st BCT, 3rd Infantry Division, Fort Stewart, Georgia
66th Armored Regiment
 1st Battalion, 3rd BCT, 4th Infantry Division, Fort Carson, Colorado
 3rd Battalion, 1st BCT, 1st Infantry Division, Fort Riley, Kansas
67th Armored Regiment
 1st Battalion, 3rd BCT, 1st Armored Division, Fort Bliss, Texas
 3rd Battalion, 2nd BCT, 3rd Infantry Division, Fort Stewart, Georgia
68th Armored Regiment
 1st Battalion, 3rd BCT, 4th Infantry Division, Fort Carson, Colorado
 Company A, 4th Battalion, 1st BCT, 82nd Airborne Division, Fort Bragg, North Carolina
69th Armored Regiment
 2nd Battalion, 2nd BCT, 3rd Infantry Division, Fort Benning, Georgia
 3rd Battalion, 1st BCT, 3rd Infantry Division, Fort Stewart, Georgia
70th Armored Regiment
 2nd Battalion, 2nd BCT, 1st Infantry Division, Fort Riley, Kansas
 4th Battalion, 1st BCT, 1st Armored Division, Fort Bliss, Texas
72nd Armored Regiment
 No active Battalions
77th Armored Regiment
 1st Battalion, 4th BCT, 1st Armored Division, Fort Bliss, Texas
81st Armored Regiment (Training Regiment)
 1st Battalion, 194th Armored Brigade, Fort Benning, Georgia
 3rd Battalion, 199th Infantry Brigade, Fort Benning, Georgia

Cavalry regiments 
1st Cavalry Regiment
 1st Squadron (Armored), 2nd BCT, 1st Armored Division, Fort Bliss, Texas
 2nd Squadron (Stryker), 1st BCT, 4th Infantry Division, Fort Carson, Colorado
 3rd Squadron (Deactivated), last assigned to 3rd Infantry Division, Fort Stewart, Georgia
 4th Squadron (Inactive), United States Military Academy, West Point, New York
 5th Squadron (Stryker), 1st BCT, 25th Infantry Division, Fort Wainwright, Alaska
 6th Squadron (Armored), 1st ABCT, 1st Armored Division, Fort Bliss, Texas
 7th Squadron (Deactivated), last assigned to 194th Armored Brigade, Fort Knox, Kentucky 
 8th Squadron (Stryker), 2nd BCT, 2nd Infantry Division, Fort Lewis, Washington
2nd Cavalry Regiment (Stryker Brigade Combat Team)
 1st Squadron (Stryker), 2nd Cavalry Regiment, Vilseck, Germany
 2nd Squadron (Stryker), 2nd Cavalry Regiment, Vilseck, Germany
 3rd Squadron (Stryker), 2nd Cavalry Regiment, Vilseck, Germany
 4th Squadron (Stryker), 2nd Cavalry Regiment, Vilseck, Germany
 Field Artillery Squadron, 2nd Cavalry Regiment, Vilseck, Germany
 Engineer Squadron, 2nd Cavalry Regiment, Grafenwoehr, Germany
 Support Squadron, 2nd Cavalry Regiment, Vilseck, Germany
3rd Cavalry Regiment (Stryker Brigade Combat Team)
 1st Squadron (Stryker), 3rd Cavalry Regiment, Fort Hood, Texas
 2nd Squadron (Stryker), 3rd Cavalry Regiment, Fort Hood, Texas
 3rd Squadron (Stryker), 3rd Cavalry Regiment, Fort Hood, Texas
 4th Squadron (Stryker), 3rd Cavalry Regiment, Fort Hood, Texas
 Field Artillery Squadron, 3rd Cavalry Regiment, Fort Hood, Texas
 Engineer Squadron, 3rd Cavalry regiment, Fort Hood, Texas
 Support Squadron, 3rd Cavalry Regiment, Fort Hood, Texas
4th Cavalry Regiment
 1st Squadron (Armored), 1st BCT, 1st Infantry Division, Fort Riley, Kansas
 3rd Squadron (Light), 3rd BCT, 25th Infantry Division, Schofield Barracks, Hawaii
 5th Squadron (Armored), 2nd BCT, 1st Infantry Division, Fort Riley, Kansas
5th Cavalry Regiment
 1st Battalion (Combined Arms), 2nd BCT, 1st Cavalry Division, Fort Hood, Texas
 2nd Battalion (Combined Arms), 1st BCT, 1st Cavalry Division, Fort Hood, Texas
6th Cavalry Regiment
 1st Squadron, Combat Aviation Brigade, 1st Infantry Division, Fort Riley, Kansas
 2nd Squadron, Combat Aviation Brigade, 25th Infantry Division, Wheeler Army Air Field, Hawaii
 3rd Squadron, 1AD Combat Aviation Brigade, Fort Bliss, TX
 4th Squadron, 16th Combat Aviation Brigade, Joint Base Lewis-McChord, Washington
 6th Squadron, Combat Aviation Brigade, 10th Mountain Division (Light Infantry), Fort Drum, New York
7th Cavalry Regiment
 1st Squadron (Armored), 1st BCT, 1st Cavalry Division, Fort Hood, Texas
 2nd Battalion (Combined Arms), 3rd BCT, 1st Cavalry Division, Fort Hood, Texas
 5th Squadron (Armored), 1st BCT, 3rd Infantry Division, Fort Stewart, Georgia
 8th Cavalry Regiment
 1st Battalion (Combined Arms), 2nd BCT, 1st Cavalry Division, Fort Hood, Texas
 2nd Battalion (Combined Arms), 1st BCT, 1st Cavalry Division, Fort Hood, Texas
 3rd Battalion (Combined Arms), 3rd BCT, 1st Cavalry Division, Fort Hood, Texas
 6th Squadron (Armored), 2nd BCT, 3rd Infantry Division, Fort Stewart, Georgia
 9th Cavalry Regiment
 1st Battalion (Combined Arms), 2nd BCT, 1st Cavalry Division, Fort Hood, Texas
 4th Squadron (Armored), 2nd BCT, 1st Cavalry Division, Fort Hood, Texas
 6th Squadron (Armored), 3rd BCT, 1st Cavalry Division, Fort Hood, Texas
 10th Cavalry Regiment
 2nd Squadron (Stryker), 1st BCT, 4th Infantry Division, Fort Carson, Colorado
 4th Squadron (Armored), 3rd BCT, 4th Infantry Division, Fort Carson, Colorado
 11th Armored Cavalry Regiment
 1st Squadron (OPFOR), Fort Irwin, California
 2nd Squadron (OPFOR), Fort Irwin, California
 Regimental Support Squadron, Fort Irwin, California
 12th Cavalry Regiment
 1st Battalion (Combined Arms), 3rd BCT, 1st Cavalry Division, Fort Hood, Texas
 2nd Battalion (Combined Arms), 1st BCT, 1st Cavalry Division, Fort Hood, Texas
 13th Cavalry Regiment
 2nd Squadron (Armored), 3rd BCT, 1st Armored Division, Fort Bliss, Texas
 14th Cavalry Regiment
 1st Squadron (Stryker), 3rd BCT, 2nd Infantry Division, Fort Lewis, Washington
 2nd Squadron (Light), 2nd BCT, 25th Infantry Division, Schofield Barracks, Hawaii
 15th Cavalry Regiment (Training Regiment)
 2nd Squadron(OSUT), 194th Armored Brigade, Fort Benning, Georgia
 5th Squadron(OSUT), 194th Armored Brigade, Fort Benning, Georgia
 16th Cavalry Regiment (Training Regiment)
 1st Squadron, 316th Cavalry Brigade, Fort Benning, Georgia
 2nd Squadron, 316th Cavalry Brigade, Fort Benning, Georgia
 3rd Squadron, 316th Cavalry Brigade, Fort Benning, Georgia
 17th Cavalry Regiment
 1st Squadron, Combat Aviation Brigade, 82nd Airborne Division, Fort Bragg, North Carolina
 2nd Squadron, Combat Aviation Brigade, 101st Airborne Division (Air Assault), Fort Campbell, Kentucky
 3rd Squadron, Combat Aviation Brigade, 3rd Infantry Division, Fort Stewart, Georgia
 5th Squadron, Combat Aviation Brigade, 2nd Infantry Division, Camp Humphreys, South Korea.
 6th Squadron, Combat Aviation Brigade, 4th Infantry Division, Fort Carson, Colorado
 7th Squadron, Combat Aviation Brigade, 1st Cavalry Division, Fort Hood, Texas
32nd Cavalry Regiment
 1st Squadron (Light), 1st BCT, 101st Airborne Division (Air Assault), Fort Campbell, Kentucky
33rd Cavalry Regiment
 1st Squadron (Light), 3rd BCT, 101st Airborne Division (Air Assault), Fort Campbell, Kentucky
38th Cavalry Regiment
 1st Squadron (Light), 1st Security Force Assistance Brigade, Fort Benning, GA
40th Cavalry Regiment
 1st Squadron (Light), 4th BCT (Airborne), 25th Infantry Division, Fort Richardson, Alaska
61st Cavalry Regiment
 3rd Squadron (Light), 2nd BCT, 4th Infantry Division, Fort Carson, Colorado
71st Cavalry Regiment
 3rd Squadron (Light), 1st BCT, 10th Mountain Division (Light Infantry), Fort Drum, New York
73rd Cavalry Regiment
 1st Squadron (Light), 2nd BCT, 82nd Airborne Division, Fort Bragg, North Carolina
 3rd Squadron (Light), 1st BCT, 82nd Airborne Division, Fort Bragg, North Carolina
 5th Squadron (Light), 3rd BCT, 82nd Airborne Division, Fort Bragg, North Carolina
75th Cavalry Regiment
 1st Squadron (Light), 2nd BCT, 101st Airborne Division (Air Assault), Fort Campbell, Kentucky
89th Cavalry Regiment
 1st Squadron (Light), 2nd BCT, 10th Mountain Division (Light Infantry), Fort Drum, New York
 3rd Squadron (Light), 3rd BCT, 10th Mountain Division (Light Infantry), Fort Polk, Louisiana
91st Cavalry Regiment
 1st Squadron (Light), 173rd BCT (Airborne), Grafenwoehr, Germany

Aviation regiments
 1st Aviation Regiment
 1st Battalion, Combat Aviation Brigade, 1st Infantry Division, Fort Riley, Kansas
 2nd Battalion, Combat Aviation Brigade, 1st Infantry Division, Fort Riley, Kansas
 3rd Battalion, Combat Aviation Brigade, 1st Infantry Division, Fort Riley, Kansas
 2nd Aviation Regiment
 2nd Battalion (Assault), Combat Aviation Brigade, 2nd Infantry Division, K-16 Air Base, Seongnam, South Korea
 3rd Battalion (General Support), Combat Aviation Brigade, 2nd Infantry Division, Camp Humphreys, Pyeongtaek, South Korea
 4th Battalion (Attack), Combat Aviation Brigade, 2nd Infantry Division, Camp Humphreys, Pyeongtaek, South Korea
 3rd Aviation Regiment
 1st Battalion, 12th Combat Aviation Brigade, Katterbach Army Airfield, Germany
 2nd Battalion, Combat Aviation Brigade, 3rd Infantry Division, Fort Stewart, Georgia
 4th Battalion, Combat Aviation Brigade, 3rd Infantry Division, Fort Stewart, Georgia
 4th Aviation Regiment
 1st Battalion, Combat Aviation Brigade, 4th Infantry Division, Fort Carson, Colorado
 2nd Battalion, Combat Aviation Brigade, 4th Infantry Division, Fort Carson, Colorado
 3rd Battalion, Combat Aviation Brigade, 4th Infantry Division, Fort Carson, Colorado
 4th Battalion, Combat Aviation Brigade, 4th Infantry Division, Fort Carson, Colorado
 10th Aviation Regiment
 1st Battalion, Combat Aviation Brigade, 10th Mountain Division (Light Infantry), Fort Drum, New York
 2nd Battalion, Combat Aviation Brigade, 10th Mountain Division (Light Infantry), Fort Drum, New York
 3rd Battalion, Combat Aviation Brigade, 10th Mountain Division (Light Infantry), Fort Drum, New York
 11th Aviation Regiment (Training)
 1st Battalion, 110th Aviation Brigade, Fort Rucker, Alabama
 13th Aviation Regiment (Training)
 1st Battalion, 1st Aviation Brigade, Fort Rucker, Alabama
 2nd Battalion, 1st Aviation Brigade, Fort Rucker, Alabama
 14th Aviation Regiment (Training Regiment)
 1st Battalion, 110th Aviation Brigade, Fort Rucker, Alabama
 25th Aviation Regiment
 1st Battalion, 16th Combat Aviation Brigade, Fort Wainwright, Alaska
 2nd Battalion, Combat Aviation Brigade, 25th Infantry Division, Wheeler Field, Hawaii
 3rd Battalion, Combat Aviation Brigade, 25th Infantry Division, Wheeler Field, Hawaii
 52nd Aviation Regiment
 1st Battalion, 16th Combat Aviation Brigade, Fort Wainwright, Alaska
 2nd Battalion, Combat Aviation Brigade, 2d Infantry Division, Camp Humphreys, South Korea
 6th Battalion, 11th Aviation Command, Los Alamitos, California
 Company G, 12th Combat Aviation Brigade, U.S. Army Europe, Germany
 58th Aviation Regiment
 1st Battalion, Fort Rucker, Alabama
 82nd Aviation Regiment
 1st Battalion, Combat Aviation Brigade, 82nd Airborne Division, Fort Bragg, North Carolina
 2nd Battalion, Combat Aviation Brigade, 82nd Airborne Division, Fort Bragg, North Carolina
 3rd Battalion, Combat Aviation Brigade, 82nd Airborne Division, Fort Bragg, North Carolina
 101st Aviation Regiment
 1st Battalion, 101st Combat Aviation Brigade, 101st Airborne Division (Air Assault), Fort Campbell, Kentucky
 5th Battalion, 101st Combat Aviation Brigade, 101st Airborne Division (Air Assault), Fort Campbell, Kentucky
 6th Battalion, 101st Combat Aviation Brigade, 101st Airborne Division (Air Assault), Fort Campbell, Kentucky
 145th Aviation Regiment (Training)
 1st Battalion, 1st Aviation Brigade, Fort Rucker, Alabama
 158th Aviation Regiment
 1st Battalion, 11th Aviation Command, Conroe, Texas
 7th Battalion, 244th Aviation Brigade, Fort Hood, Texas (USAR)
 Company I, Fort Hood, Texas
 159th Aviation Regiment
 5th Battalion, 244th Aviation Brigade, Fort Eustis, Virginia
 160th Aviation Regiment (Special Operations) (160th SOAR)
 1st Battalion, Fort Campbell, Kentucky
 2nd Battalion, Fort Campbell, Kentucky
 3rd Battalion, Hunter Army Airfield, Georgia
 4th Battalion, Fort Lewis, Washington
 210th Aviation Regiment (Training)
 1st Battalion, 128th Aviation Brigade, Fort Rucker, Alabama
 2nd Battalion, 128th Aviation Brigade, Fort Rucker, Alabama
 212th Aviation Regiment (Training)
 1st Battalion, 110th Aviation Brigade, Fort Rucker, Alabama
 214th Aviation Regiment
 1st Battalion, 12th Combat Aviation Brigade, Katterbach Army Airfield, Germany
 222nd Aviation Regiment (Training)
 1st Battalion, 128th Aviation Brigade, Joint Base Eustis-Langley, Virginia
 223rd Aviation Regiment (Training)
 1st Battalion, 110th Aviation Brigade, Fort Rucker, Alabama
 227th Aviation Regiment
 1st Battalion, Combat Aviation Brigade, 1st Cavalry Division, Fort Hood, Texas
 2nd Battalion, Combat Aviation Brigade, 1st Cavalry Division, Fort Hood, Texas
 3rd Battalion, Combat Aviation Brigade, 1st Cavalry Division, Fort Hood, Texas
 4th Battalion, Combat Aviation Brigade, 1st Cavalry Division, Fort Hood, Texas
 228th Aviation Regiment
 1st Battalion, Joint Task Force Bravo, Soto Cano Air Base, Honduras
 2nd Battalion, 244th Aviation Brigade, Horsham, Pennsylvania (USAR)
 229th Aviation Regiment
 1st Battalion, 16th Combat Aviation Brigade (United States), Fort Lewis, Washington
 8th Battalion, 11th Theater Aviation Command (United States), Fort Knox, Kentucky
 501st Aviation Regiment
 1st Battalion, Combat Aviation Brigade, 1st Armored Division (United States), Ft. Bliss, Texas
 2nd Battalion, Combat Aviation Brigade, 1st Armored Division (United States), Ft. Bliss, Texas
 3rd Battalion, Combat Aviation Brigade, 1st Armored Division (United States), Ft. Bliss, Texas

Infantry regiments

Light, Stryker and mechanized infantry
 1st Infantry Regiment
 1st Battalion (Garrison), United States Military Academy, West Point, New York
 2nd Battalion (Stryker), 2nd BCT, 2nd Infantry Division, Fort Lewis, Washington
2nd Infantry Regiment
 2nd Battalion (Light), 3rd BCT, 10th Mountain Division, Fort Polk, Louisiana
3rd Infantry Regiment
 1st Battalion (Ceremonial), Military District of Washington, Fort Myer, Virginia
 2nd Battalion (Stryker), 3rd BCT, 2nd Infantry Division, Fort Lewis, Washington
 4th Battalion (Ceremonial), Military District of Washington, Fort Myer, Virginia
4th Infantry Regiment
 1st Battalion (OPFOR), Joint Multinational Training Center, Seventh U.S. Army, Hohenfels, Germany
 2nd Battalion (Light), 3rd BCT, 10th Mountain Division (Light Infantry), Fort Polk, Louisiana
5th Infantry Regiment
 1st Battalion (Stryker), 1st BCT, 25th Infantry Division, Fort Wainwright, Alaska
 2nd Battalion (Combined Arms), 3rd BCT Brigade, 1st Armored Division, Fort Bliss, Texas
6th Infantry Regiment
 1st Battalion (Combined Arms), 2nd BCT, 1st Armored Division, Fort Bliss, Texas
7th Infantry Regiment
 2nd Battalion (Combined Arms), 1st BCT, 3rd Infantry Division, Fort Stewart, Georgia
8th Infantry Regiment
 1st Battalion (Combined Arms), 3rd BCT, 4th Infantry Division, Fort Carson, Colorado
9th Infantry Regiment
 4th Battalion (Stryker), 1st BCT, 4th Infantry Division, Fort Carson, Colorado
10th Infantry Regiment (Training Regiment)
 2nd Battalion, 3rd Chemical Brigade, Fort Leonard Wood, Missouri
 3rd Battalion, 3rd Chemical Brigade, Fort Leonard Wood, Missouri
 4th Battalion, 171st Infantry Brigade, Fort Jackson, South Carolina
11th Infantry Regiment (Training Regiment)
 2nd Battalion, 199th Infantry Brigade, Fort Benning, Georgia
 3rd Battalion, 199th Infantry Brigade, Fort Benning, Georgia
12th Infantry Regiment
 1st Battalion (Light), 2nd BCT, 4th Infantry Division, Fort Carson, Colorado
 2nd Battalion (Light), 2nd BCT, 4th Infantry Division, Fort Carson, Colorado
13th Infantry Regiment (Training Regiment)
 1st Battalion, 193rd Infantry Brigade, Fort Jackson, South Carolina
 2nd Battalion, 193rd Infantry Brigade, Fort Jackson, South Carolina
 3rd Battalion, 193rd Infantry Brigade, Fort Jackson, South Carolina
 14th Infantry Regiment
 2nd Battalion (Light), 2nd BCT, 10th Mountain Division (Light Infantry), Fort Drum, New York
 15th Infantry Regiment
 3rd Battalion (Combined Arms), 2nd BCT, 3rd Infantry Division, Fort Benning, Georgia
 16th Infantry Regiment
 1st Battalion (Combined Arms), 1st BCT, 1st Infantry Division, Fort Riley, Kansas
 17th Infantry Regiment
 1st Battalion (Stryker), 2nd BCT, 2nd Infantry Division, Fort Lewis, Washington
 4th Battalion (Stryker), 1st BCT, 1st Armored Division, Fort Bliss, Texas
 18th Infantry Regiment
 1st Battalion (Combined Arms), 2nd BCT, 1st Infantry Division, Fort Riley, Kansas
 19th Infantry Regiment (Training Regiment)
 1st Battalion, 198th Infantry Brigade, Fort Benning, Georgia
 2nd Battalion, 198th Infantry Brigade, Fort Benning, Georgia
 20th Infantry Regiment
 5th Battalion (Stryker), 1st BCT, 2nd Infantry Division, Fort Lewis, Washington
 21st Infantry Regiment
 1st Battalion (Light), 2nd BCT, 25th Infantry Division, Schofield Barracks, Hawaii
 3rd Battalion (Stryker), 1st BCT, 25th Infantry Division, Fort Wainwright, Alaska
 22nd Infantry Regiment
 2nd Battalion (Light), 1st BCT, 10th Mountain Division, Fort Drum, New York
 23rd Infantry Regiment
 1st Battalion, 3rd BCT, 2nd Infantry Division, Fort Lewis, Washington
 2nd Battalion, 4th BCT, 2nd Infantry Division, Fort Lewis, Washington
 4th Battalion, 2nd BCT, 2nd Infantry Division, Fort Lewis, Washington
 24th Infantry Regiment
 1st Battalion, 1st BCT, 25th Infantry Division, Fort Wainwright, Alaska
 27th Infantry Regiment
 1st Battalion, 2nd BCT, 25th Infantry Division, Schofield Barracks, Hawaii
 2nd Battalion, 3rd BCT, 25th Infantry Division, Schofield Barracks, Hawaii
 28th Infantry Regiment
 1st Battalion, Task Force, 3rd Infantry Division, Fort Stewart, Georgia
 29th Infantry Regiment (Training Regiment)
 1st Battalion, 199th Infantry Brigade, Fort Benning, Georgia
 30th Infantry Regiment
 2nd Battalion, 3rd BCT, 10th Mountain Division (Light Infantry), Fort Polk, Louisiana
 31st Infantry Regiment
 4th Battalion, 2nd BCT, 10th Mountain Division (Light Infantry), Fort Drum, New York
 32nd Infantry Regiment
 1st Battalion, 1st BCT, 10th Mountain Division (Light Infantry), Fort Drum, New York
 34th Infantry Regiment(Training Regiment)
 1st Battalion, 165th Infantry Brigade, Fort Jackson, South Carolina
 3rd Battalion, 165th Infantry Brigade, Fort Jackson, South Carolina
 35th Infantry Regiment
 2nd Battalion, 3rd BCT, 25th Infantry Division, Schofield Barracks, Hawaii
 36th Infantry Regiment
 1st Battalion, 1st BCT, 1st Armored Division, Fort Bliss, Texas
 38th Infantry Regiment
 1st Battalion, 1st BCT, 4th Infantry Division, Fort Carson, Colorado
 39th Infantry Regiment (United States) (Training Regiment)
 2nd Battalion, 165th Infantry Brigade, Fort Jackson, South Carolina
 41st Infantry Regiment
 1st Battalion, 3rd BCT, 1st Armored Division, Fort Bliss, Texas
 3rd Battalion, 1st BCT, 1st Armored Division, Fort Bliss, Texas
 46th Infantry Regiment
 1st Battalion, 198th Infantry Brigade, Fort Benning, Georgia
 47th Infantry Regiment (Training Regiment)
 2nd Battalion, 198th Infantry Brigade, Fort Benning, Georgia
48th Infantry Regiment (Training Regiment)
 1st Battalion, 3rd Chemical Brigade, Fort Leonard Wood, Missouri
 2nd Battalion, 3rd Chemical Brigade, Fort Leonard Wood, Missouri
50th Infantry Regiment (Training Regiment)
 1st Battalion, 198th Infantry Brigade, Fort Benning, Georgia
51st Infantry Regiment
52nd Infantry Regiment
54th Infantry Regiment (Training Regiment)
 2nd Battalion, 198th Infantry Brigade, Fort Benning, Georgia
58th Infantry Regiment (Training Regiment)
 2nd Battalion, 198th Infantry Brigade, Fort Benning, Georgia
60th Infantry Regiment (Training Regiment)
 2nd Battalion, 193rd Infantry Brigade, Fort Jackson, South Carolina
 3rd Battalion, 193rd Infantry Brigade, Fort Jackson, South Carolina
61st Infantry Regiment (Training Regiment)
 1st Battalion, 165th Infantry Brigade, Fort Jackson, South Carolina
87th Infantry Regiment
 1st Battalion, 1st BCT, 10th Mountain Division (Light Infantry), Fort Drum, New York
 2nd Battalion, 2nd BCT, 10th Mountain Division (Light Infantry), Fort Drum, New York
133rd Infantry Regiment 
 1st Battalion, 2nd BCT, 34th Infantry Division, Waterloo, Iowa

Airborne and air assault infantry regiments
26th Infantry Regiment (Air Assault)
 1st Battalion, 2nd BCT, 101st Airborne Division (Air Assault), Fort Campbell, Kentucky
187th Infantry Regiment (Air Assault)
 1st Battalion, 3rd BCT, 101st Airborne Division (Air Assault), Fort Campbell, Kentucky
 3rd Battalion, 3rd BCT, 101st Airborne Division (Air Assault), Fort Campbell, Kentucky
188th Infantry Regiment (Airborne)(Inactive)
 325th Infantry Regiment (Airborne)
 1st Battalion, 2nd BCT, 82nd Airborne Division, Fort Bragg, North Carolina
 2nd Battalion, 2nd BCT, 82nd Airborne Division, Fort Bragg, North Carolina
 327th Infantry Regiment (Air Assault)
 1st Battalion, 1st BCT, 101st Airborne Division (Air Assault), Fort Campbell, Kentucky
 2nd Battalion, 1st BCT, 101st Airborne Division (Air Assault), Fort Campbell, Kentucky
 501st Infantry Regiment (Airborne)
 1st Battalion, 4th BCT, 25th Infantry Division, Fort Richardson, Alaska
 2nd Battalion, 1st BCT, 82nd Airborne Division, Fort Bragg, North Carolina
 502nd Infantry Regiment (Air Assault)
 1st Battalion, 2nd BCT, 101st Airborne Division (Air Assault), Fort Campbell, Kentucky
 2nd Battalion, 2nd BCT, 101st Airborne Division (Air Assault), Fort Campbell, Kentucky
 503rd Infantry Regiment (Airborne)
 1st Battalion, 173rd ABCT, Vicenza, Italy
 2nd Battalion, 173rd ABCT, Vicenza, Italy
504th Infantry Regiment (Airborne)
 1st Battalion, 1st BCT, 82nd Airborne Division, Fort Bragg, North Carolina
 2nd Battalion, 1st BCT, 82nd Airborne Division, Fort Bragg, North Carolina
 505th Infantry Regiment (Airborne)
 1st Battalion, 3rd BCT, 82nd Airborne Division, Fort Bragg, North Carolina
 2nd Battalion, 3rd BCT, 82nd Airborne Division, Fort Bragg, North Carolina
 506th Infantry Regiment (Air Assault)
 1st Battalion, 1st BCT, 101st Airborne Division (Air Assault), Fort Campbell, Kentucky
 2nd Battalion, 3rd BCT, 101st Airborne Division (Air Assault), Fort Campbell, Kentucky
 507th Infantry Regiment (Airborne)(Training Regiment)
 1st Battalion, Airborne and Ranger Training Brigade, Fort Benning, Georgia
 508th Infantry Regiment (Airborne)
 1st Battalion, 3rd BCT, 82nd Airborne Division, Fort Bragg, North Carolina
 2nd Battalion, 2nd BCT, 82nd Airborne Division, Fort Bragg, North Carolina
 509th Infantry Regiment (Airborne)
 1st Battalion, JRTC, Fort Polk, Louisiana (Operates as an Opposing Force for training)
 3rd Battalion, 4th BCT, 25th Infantry Division, Fort Richardson, Alaska
 511th Infantry Regiment (Airborne)(Inactive)

Ranger infantry
 75th Ranger Regiment
 1st Battalion, Hunter Army Airfield, Georgia
 2nd Battalion, Fort Lewis, Washington
 3rd Battalion, Fort Benning, Georgia
 Special Troops Battalion, Fort Benning, Georgia

Special forces
1st Special Forces Command (Airborne)
 1st Special Forces Group (Airborne)
 1st Battalion, Okinawa, Japan
 2nd Battalion, Fort Lewis, Washington
 3rd Battalion, Fort Lewis, Washington
 4th Battalion, Fort Lewis, Washington
 Support Battalion, Fort Lewis, Washington
 3rd Special Forces Group (Airborne)
 1st Battalion, Fort Bragg, North Carolina
 2nd Battalion, Fort Bragg, North Carolina
 3rd Battalion, Fort Bragg, North Carolina
 4th Battalion, Fort Bragg, North Carolina
 Support Battalion, Fort Bragg, North Carolina
 5th Special Forces Group (Airborne)
 1st Battalion, Fort Campbell, Kentucky
 2nd Battalion, Fort Campbell, Kentucky
 3rd Battalion, Fort Campbell, Kentucky
 4th Battalion, Fort Campbell, Kentucky
 Support Battalion, Fort Campbell, Kentucky
 7th Special Forces Group (Airborne)
 1st Battalion, Eglin AFB, Florida
 2nd Battalion, Eglin AFB, Florida
 3rd Battalion, Eglin AFB, Florida
 4th Battalion, Eglin AFB, Florida
 Support Battalion, Eglin AFB, Florida
 10th Special Forces Group (Airborne)
 1st Battalion, Stuttgart, Germany
 2nd Battalion, Fort Carson, Colorado
 3rd Battalion, Fort Carson, Colorado
 4th Battalion, Fort Carson, Colorado
 Support Battalion, Fort Carson, Colorado
 19th Special Forces Group (Airborne) (Army National Guard)
 1st Battalion (WAARNG, UTARNG)
 2nd Battalion (OHARNG, RIARNG, WVARNG)
 5th Battalion (COARNG)
 20th Special Forces Group (Airborne) (Army National Guard)
 1st Battalion (ALARNG, MAARNG)
 2nd Battalion (ILARNG, MDARNG, MSARNG)
 3rd Battalion (FLARNG, NCARNG)

Combat support (CS), combat service support (CSS), and special branches

Concept
The CS, CSS, and special branch regimental plans fully integrate into the USARS under the "whole branch" concept. It is the responsibility of all proponents to incorporate within their corps, the intent and spirit of the regimental system to provide soldiers the opportunity for affiliation.

While this initiative mandates a uniform approach to regimental affiliation throughout the Army, it is a system that has no tradition within the Army and duplicates the sense of affiliation that CS, CSS, and special branch soldiers already had for their branch (Ordnance, Signal Corps, etc.)

Branches

Combat support

Combat service support

Special

References

Army Regulation 600-82, U.S. Army Regimental System, 5 June 1990. Accessed 23 October 2016.

Regiments of the United States Army
United States Army organization